Gaylord Palms Resort & Convention Center is a hotel  and convention center, opened in Kissimmee, Florida, on February 2, 2002. It also acts as the de facto convention center for Osceola County, Florida, until plans for their own dedicated convention center are realized. It has  of total meeting space, and a total of 1,718 guest rooms and suites.

Gaylord Palms is owned by Ryman Hospitality Properties (formerly known as Gaylord Entertainment Company), and operated by Marriott International. It is a sister hotel to the Gaylord Opryland Resort & Convention Center, Gaylord Texan Resort & Convention Center,  Gaylord National Resort & Convention Center, and Gaylord Rockies Resort & Convention Center.

Gaylord Palms was originally to be named Opryland Hotel Florida. However, when Gaylord Entertainment decided to re-brand their Opryland Hotels division to Gaylord Hotels on October 26, 2001, the name Gaylord Palms was given to the Florida hotel.

Gaylord Palms conducts Christmas programming with large-scale events like Best of Florida Christmas and ICE!, an attraction hand-carved from two million pounds of ice inside an attraction that is kept at 9 degrees Fahrenheit.

In 2021, Gaylord Palms opened its largest expansion ever, a $158-million project which added 100,000 square feet of convention space and more than 300 guest rooms and suites. It's Cypress Springs Water Park was also expanded with the addition of an "action river" attraction.

Gaylord Palms is a member of Great Hotels Of The World alliance.

Hotel Areas
Gaylord Palms is built around a  glass-covered atrium, divided into four areas, each with their own activities and guest rooms. The atrium has more than 500,000 plants, as well as Florida fish and wildlife.
 St. Augustine has an old-world colonial Spanish theme based on North America's oldest existing permanent settlement. Among its features are a wedding gazebo, a replica of the Castillo de San Marcos (North America's oldest fort), an alligator exhibit, and a display with treasures from the Spanish galleon Our Lady of Atocha, sunk off the Florida coast in 1622.
 Key West is inspired by Mallory Square, the central area of the major Florida Keys port city. It has a -long sailboat, which is designed around a seafood restaurant called MOOR.
 The Everglades is themed on the river of grass. In addition to Gaylord Hotels' signature restaurant, Old Hickory Steakhouse, The Everglades has a spa.
 Emerald Bay has  of meeting space and 26 luxury suites. Several shops and boutiques can be found on the ground floor of this locale.
 Gulf Coast has 300 guest rooms including twelve suites and one presidential suite.

Convention Center
The Gaylord Palms Convention Center has  of meeting space. More than half of that space is one large bay called the Florida Exhibition Hall, which has  including prefunction space.

References

External links

 

Buildings and structures in Kissimmee, Florida
Convention centers in Florida
Gaylord Hotels
Hotels in Greater Orlando
Resorts in Florida
Tourist attractions in Osceola County, Florida
2002 establishments in Florida